Local elections were held in the Indian state of Rajasthan for 90 urban local bodies in the state on 28 January 2021. The Indian National Congress registered a victory in a neck-to-neck fight with the Bharatiya Janata Party.

Results

References

Notes 

Elections in Rajasthan